Tan Haoming was a member of the Old Guangxi Clique and military governor of Guangxi from April 1917 to July 1921. He was born on 13 July  1871 in  Longzhou County, Guangxi province, China, and died on 17 April 1925. He was of Zhuang ethnicity.

External links
TRAGEDY OF CHINESE REVOLUTION
Rulers: Chinese Administrative divisions; Guangxi

People of the 1911 Revolution
1871 births
1925 deaths
Zhuang people